The 56th season of the Campeonato Gaúcho kicked off on January 18, 1976, and ended on August 22, 1976. Thirty-two teams participated. Internacional won their 24th title.

Participating teams

System 
The championship would have four stages.:

 Preliminary phase: The thirty clubs that had qualified in the Copa Governador do Estado of the previous year would be divided into six groups of five teams. Each team would play against the teams of their own group twice and the three best teams of each group would qualify to the First stage.
 First phase: The remaining eighteen teams, now joined by Grêmio and Internacional, would play each other once. The four best teams would qualify to the Second round. The winner would also qualify for the Final phase.
 Second phase: The remaining four teams would play each other twice. the best team in each round qualified to the Final phase.
 Finals: The winners of the first stage and the two rounds of the second stage qualified to this stage. Each participant would have one point allotted to them by stage won, and the teams would play each other until one reached four points, with that team winning the title.

Championship

Preliminary phase

Group 1

Group 2

Group 3

Group 4

Group 5

Group 6

First phase

Playoffs

Second phase

First round

Second round

Finals

Copa Governador do Estado

System 
The cup would have six stages: 

 First phase: The twenty-four teams that had been eliminated in the Final phase of the previous year's Copa Governador do Estado would be divided into six groups of four teams. each team would play twice against the teams of its own group. All teams qualified to the Second phase.
 Second phase: The twenty-four teams joined the twelve teams that had been eliminated in the Preliminary phase of the Campeonato Gaúcho and were divided into six groups of six teams. Once again, all teams qualified to the Third phase.
 Third phase: The thirty-six teams joined the sixteen teams that had been eliminated in the First phase of the Campeonato Gaúcho and were divided into ten groups of five teams. The two best teams of each group and the two best third-placers would qualify to the 1977 Campeonato Gaúcho. The best teams of each group qualified to the Fourth phase. wins by two goals of difference or more were worth an extra point.
 Fourth phase: The remaining ten teams would play each other in a double-legged knockout tie. The qualified team with the best performance in the previous stage qualified directly to the Final phase.
 Fifth phase: The remaining four teams would play each other in a double-legged knockout tie. The winners qualified to the Final phase.
 Final phase: The remaining three teams would play each other once. The team with the most points won the title.

Third phase

Group A

Group B

Group C

Group D

Group E

Group F

Group G

Group H

Group I

Group J

Fourth phase 

|}

Fifth phase 

|}

Final phase

References 

Campeonato Gaúcho seasons
Gaúcho